Return of the Jedi is a film in the Star Wars saga. It may also refer to:

Return of the Jedi (novel), the novelization of the film
Return of the Jedi (soundtrack), the soundtrack to the film
Star Wars: Return of the Jedi (1984 video game)
Star Wars: Return of the Jedi (1988 video game)
Super Star Wars: Return of the Jedi, a 1994 side-scrolling action game for the Super NES
Return of the Jedi (radio), a radio adaptation of the film, produced in 1996

sv:Return of the Jedi